Abshenasan Expressway, also known as Iranpars Expressway, is an expressway in northern Tehran.

It is named after Hassan Abshenasan, former commander of the 23rd Commando Division who was killed during Iran–Iraq War.

Expressways in Tehran
Expressways in Iran